Reginald Joseph Hayward Jr. (born March 14, 1979) is a former American football defensive end who played nine seasons in the National Football League (NFL) for the Denver Broncos and Jacksonville Jaguars. He played college football at Iowa State University, and was drafted by the Broncos in the third round of the 2001 NFL Draft.

Early years
Hayward grew up in Dolton, IL a small town 10 minutes south of Chicago. He attended Thornridge High School, where he also lettered in track, football and basketball.

College career
Hayward was a three-year starter at Iowa State University, where he was a first-team All-Big 12 Conference selection and the Arthur Floyd Scott Award winner during his senior year.

Professional career

Denver Broncos
Hayward was drafted by the Denver Broncos in the third round of the 2001 NFL Draft. Hayward played four seasons with Denver.

Jacksonville Jaguars
Hayward was signed by the Jacksonville Jaguars as an unrestricted free agent on March 2, 2005.

In his first year as a Jaguar, Hayward accumulated 33 tackles (27 solo), 8.5 sacks, and six pass deflections in 15 games.  He is also credited with two forced fumbles in the 2005 NFL season.  Unfortunately, at the start of the 2006 season, Hayward suffered a season-ending injury to his Achilles tendon and was placed on injured reserve.

In 2009, in the first game of the season, Hayward broke his fibula and was out for the rest of the season. Before the injury he had already recorded a sack and two tackles. He was re-signed on April 1, 2010.

Hayward was released by the Jaguars on July 7, 2010.

References

External links
 Jacksonville Jaguars bio

1979 births
Living people
American football defensive ends
Denver Broncos players
Iowa State Cyclones football players
Jacksonville Jaguars players
People from Dolton, Illinois
Players of American football from Illinois
Sportspeople from Cook County, Illinois